Comrie is a lunar impact crater. It is located on the rugged far side of the Moon relative to the Earth, beyond the western limb. Nearby craters of note include Ohm to the south-southwest, Shternberg to the southwest, and Parenago to the northeast.

This feature forms the central member of a formation of three connected craters. A slightly smaller crater is attached to the northern end, and the two share a straight rim. This crater also lies across the northern part of a larger, heavily worn feature to the south, and little of Comrie's rim survives along its southern extent. The remaining rim is worn and eroded.

Within the crater interior, a small crater lies near the northwest rim, a smaller crater just to the southwest of the midpoint, and a still smaller crater along the surviving southwest rim. There is a low central ridge at the midpoint. The eastern half of the interior floor is somewhat irregular, but contains only a few tiny craterlets. Streaks from the ray system of Ohm lie across the interior of Comrie, particularly in the western half.

Satellite craters
By convention these features are identified on lunar maps by placing the letter on the side of the crater midpoint that is closest to Comrie.

References

 
 
 
 
 
 
 
 
 
 
 
 

Impact craters on the Moon